Jesús Oropesa Chivilches (born 31 March 1970) is a Peruvian football manager, currently in charge of Unión Comercio.

Career
Born in Camaná, Oropesa worked at Universidad San Martín, América Cochahuayco, Atlético Minero (where he led the club to the Segunda División in 2008 after finishing in the semifinals of the Copa Perú), Deportivo Coopsol, and the Peru national under-20 team as an assistant. He was in charge of Hijos de Acosvinchos during the 2011 season, and later was appointed in charge of Franciscano San Román.

In February 2012, Oropesa was named Sport Áncash manager. He later took over Willy Serrato in September of that year, and was in charge of Binacional during the 2013 season before being appointed at the helm of Sportivo Huracán on 26 July 2013.

In March 2014, Oropesa returned to Willy Serrato, and worked at Binacional, San Antonio de Piura and Willy Serrato again before being appointed manager of Alfredo Salinas in February 2018. In September, he was in charge of Edwin Retamoso's club FC Retamoso, being later an assistant of Wilmar Valencia at Atlético Grau in 2019.

In 2020, Oropesa was Jahir Butrón's assistant at Alianza Atlético, before being returning to a managerial role on 11 January 2021, with Sport Chavelines. He resigned on 17 July with the club in the first position, and returned to Atlético Grau late in the month, now as manager.

On 4 November 2021, despite achieving promotion to the Liga 1 as champions, Oropesa left Atlético Grau after failing to agree new terms. He was named Unión Comercio manager on 18 December, and also led the side to a promotion to the top tier; on 22 November 2021, he renewed his contract.

References

External links

1970 births
Living people
People from Camaná Province
Peruvian football managers
Peruvian Primera División managers
Sport Áncash managers
Deportivo Binacional FC managers
Atlético Grau managers
Unión Comercio managers